The Throes is an indie band formed in 1988 in Northern Virginia.

Background 

The original lineup consisted of singer and guitarist Bill Campbell, percussionist Harry Evans and bassist Joy Gewalt. Friends from the suburbs of Greater Washington, D.C., the Throes released an independent cassette in 1989, The Era of Condolence, featuring seven songs written by Campbell and Evans of "youth, love and unanswered questions."

In 1990, they were the first alternative pop band to sign with R.E.X. Records, an indie label based out of New York City and known mostly for its speed and death metal acts. In September 1990, they released All The Flowers Growing In Your Mother's Eyes. Reviewer J. Edward Keyes wrote, Flowers "creates moody, dour pop akin to REM and The Smiths" with "sparkling guitar" driven by "idiosyncratic percussion." On the whole, Keyes says, the album is "charged with the unmistakable energy of possibility, the sound of a young band who still believes they can change the world."

Three albums followed: Fall on Your World (1992); 12 Before 9 (1995), featuring the only remaining founding member, Bill Campbell, presiding over its creation; and Ameroafriasiana  (1997), ushering the return of Harry Evans.

The Throes fifth album, Evila, is a live album that includes versions of 10 songs, including Say Hello, All the Flowers Growing in Your Mother's Eyes, and Just One Moment.

In 2020, All The Flowers Growing in Your Mother's Eyes and The Era of Condolence were remastered and released on vinyl, CD, and digital through Lo-Fidelity Records.

Discography

Studio albums 
 All the Flowers Growing in Your Mother’s Eyes (1990) – R.E.X
 Fall on Your World (1992) – Glasshouse
 12 Before 9 (1995) – Rode Dog/BMG
 Ameroafriasiana (1997) – Brainstorm Artists

Compilations 
 Argh!!! (The Official R.E.X. Sampler), 1991
 When Worlds Collide: A Tribute to Daniel Amos, 2000

References

External links 
 
[ AllMusic.com: The Throes]

American Christian rock groups
Indie pop groups from Virginia
Indie pop groups from Washington, D.C.
Musical groups established in 1988